The C.C. Crowell Jr. House is a historic house in Blair, Nebraska. It was built in 1901 for C.C. Crowell, Jr., a businessman who bequeathed it to the United Methodist Church upon his death. It was remodelled as a retirement facility for Methodists and renamed the Crowell Memorial Home. It was subsequently remodelled as a private residence. The house was designed in the Classical Revival and Queen Anne architectural styles. It has been listed on the National Register of Historic Places since July 19, 1982.

References

National Register of Historic Places in Washington County, Nebraska
Queen Anne architecture in Nebraska
Neoclassical architecture in Nebraska
Houses completed in 1901